This page features a list of awards and nominations received by Greek recording artist and entertainer Sakis Rouvas from the beginning of his career in 1991 to present day. Rouvas has released thirteen studio albums: Sakis Rouvas (1991), Min Andistekese (1992), Gia Sena (1993), Aima, Dakrya & Idrotas (1994), Tora Arhizoun Ta Dyskola (1996), Kati Apo Mena (1998), 21os Akatallilos (2000), Ola Kala (2002), To Hrono Stamatao (2003), S'eho Erotefthi (2005), Iparhi Agapi Edo (2006), Irthes (2008), and Parafora (2010). He has also released two live albums: Live Ballads (2006) and This Is My Live (2007). These album have been released through PolyGram Records Greece (1991–96), Minos EMI (1997–present), and abroad on Universal Music France (2002–2007). All of his albums have been certified gold or higher by the International Federation of the Phonographic Industry of Greece. As of 2008, he has sold an estimated near two million albums, making him one of the best-selling Greek artists in history.

Rouvas is amongst the most awarded Greek entertainers of all time. In addition to his main domain, music, he has also been recognized in sports, television, fashion, and for his humanitarian work. Rouvas began his career as an athlete in 1987 and received awards at a national level. As a performer, he has won 15 Pop Corn Music Awards, six Arion Music Awards, four Status Men of the Year Awards —the most of any musician— and 17 MAD Video Music Awards — more than any other male artist and second overall. He has also received international awards such as a Balkan Music Award, an MTV Europe Music Award, a Tashir Armenian Music Award, and a World Music Award, as well as an Abdi Ipekçi Prize for his efforts in improving Greco-Turkish relations. Rouvas has also represented Greece in the Eurovision Song Contest on two occasions, taking top ten positions both times: third (2004) and seventh (2009). Rouvas has received in excess of 52 awards out of 120 nominations, making him one of the most awarded Greek artists in history. In addition to these recognized awards, Rouvas was also named "Entertainer of the Decade" by Down Town in 2009, while in 2010 Forbes ranked him as the third most powerful and influential Greek celebrity and highest-ranked singer. He was also named Greek People'''s first "Sexiest Man Alive".

Note that this list includes only recognized awards and not polls and other awards. The list may be incomplete due to the lack of sources on Greek awards prior to the new millennium.

Arion Music Awards
The Arion Music Awards are the official Greek music awards since 2002, and are the successor of the Hellenic Music Pop Corn Awards which were organized by the Greek magazine Pop Star from 1997–2001. The Arions were held for the first five years by Mega Channel and now are held by ANT1. The awards are usually held in April but in 2007 were held in October due to the network change, and thus, no ceremony for the 2008 edition was held. Rouvas has won six awards from 25 nominations.

Balkan Music Awards
The Balkan Music Awards is an award ceremony organized by Balkanica TV since 2010, celebrating the best in music from Balkan countries. Rouvas has won one award from one nomination.

Cyprus Music Awards
The Cyprus Music Awards are the official Cypriot music awards, held annually by Cyprus College in Nicosia, Cyprus since 2006. Rouvas hasn't managed to win any awards from four official nominations, and six overall (Although the top five highest-selling records are reviewed for the "best-selling" categories, the nomination is not considered official unless won).

Eurovision Song Contest
The Eurovision Song Contest is an annual competition held among active member countries of the EBU. The contest, which has been broadcast every year since its début in 1956, is one of the longest-running television programs and most watched in the world. It is the world's largest music festival, with viewing rates of 100-600 million recorded. In 2004, Rouvas won third place with the song "Shake It", which was tied for the highest placement Greece had ever received in the contest since the 1974 début, up until that year. In 2006, Rouvas would go on to host the contest in Athens along with hostess Maria Menounos. Rouvas will also be Greece's representative in the 2009 contest with the song "This Is Our Night" in May in Moscow, Russia.

Johnnie Walker Men of the Year Awards
The Johnnie Walker Men of the Year Awards is a Cypriot award ceremony held annually to honour men who have excelled in their field of work.

MAD TV/Vogue Fashion Icons Award
The MAD TV/Vogue Fashion Icons Award were a one-time award organized by MAD TV and the Greek edition of Vogue Magazine held in 2003 to recognize the most fashionable Greek television personalities and style icons. Rouvas was one of the only two musicians awarded, the other being Despina Vandi for the title "Best-Dressed Woman in Showbiz".

MAD Video Music Awards
The MAD Video Music Awards are held annually in June by MAD TV since 2004. In its first two years, the awards were televised on ANT1 for non-satellite viewers, but have since moved to Alpha TV. Rouvas holds a number of records at the MAD Video Music Awards. At the 2010 ceremony, he tied the record for most wins in one night, with four, while his five-time nominee "Spase To Hrono" broke the record for most nominations received by a single video (later tied with "Tora") until he broke his own record in 2012 with "I Dyo Mas", which received six nominations between 2011 and 2012. Since 2009, Rouvas has won the most coveted prize, Artist of the Year, an unprecedented four times. Rouvas has won 17 awards from 46 nominations, making him the male artist with the most wins, and second most-honoured artist overall.Winners of 2007 2009 Nominations MAD Video Music Awards 2011. MAD TV. Airdate: 14 June 2011

MTV Europe Music Awards
The MTV Europe Music Awards is an awards ceremony organized annually since 1994 by MTV Networks and celebrate the best in European music. The network began a Greek branch in 2007, thus making the country eligible for the ceremony since 2008. Rouvas has won one award, with another nomination.

OGAE
OGAE Song Contest
OGAE, is the international fan club of the Eurovision Song Contest. It has branches in 37 European countries. Every year, the organization puts together four non-profit competitions (Song Contest, Second Chance Contest, Video Contest and Homessed Song Contest). The OGAE Song Contest is an audio event in which all OGAE national clubs can enter with an original song released in the previous 12 months in their countries and sung in one of the country's official languages. In honor of his selection to be the Greek 2009 eurovision entrant, Rouvas was chosen by local clubs to be entered in the 23rd OGAE in Zaragosa, Spain on October 25, 2008, where he won third place with 130 points, coming in only behind Croatia and the United Kingdom, respectively.

OGAE Video Contest

Pop Corn Music Awards

The Pop Corn Music Awards are a defunct awards ceremony that were the first official Greek music awards show from 1992–2001 and were organized by the Greek magazine Pop Corn. The Arion Music Awards became their successor in 2002. For four consecutive years, Rouvas was said to have "monopolized" the awards ceremony, winning a number of the major awards. Since the introduction of the Best Male Stage Performance category, Rouvas received the award every year. Rouvas has won at least 15 awards from 20 nominations.

Prosopa Awards
The Prosopa Awards are an annual awards ceremony honoring Greek excellence in television and media, televised on Mega Channel since 2003. Rouvas has won one award.

Status Men of the Year Awards

The Status Awards are held annually since 1996 by the Greek edition of the men's magazine Status, usually every March and are televised by Star Channel. The magazine nominates men for excellence within their fields, which are then voted on by the magazine's readers. Rouvas has won four awards and is tied for the musician with the most awards.

Tashir Armenian Music Awards
The Tashir Armenian Music Awards are an annual awards ceremony to celebrate the best in the music of the Armenian diaspora. Rouvas was given an honorary award as one of six favourite representatives of the Armenian public to win the Eurovision Song Contest 2009

Thessaloniki Song Festival
The Thessaloniki Song Festival is an annual competition held in Thessaloniki since 1962. It is the longest-running music festival and award ceremony in Greece. There are a number of titles awarded, with the ultimate winner being the recipient of the Best Composition award, which made Rouvas the winner of the 30th annual contest with his début single composed by Nikos Terzis, with lyrics by Giorgos Pavrianos. Following his loss of the "Best Vocals" award, which he lost to another newcoming artist, Giorgos Alkaios, by only one point, many reporters claimed that the contest was rigged.

Honorary awarding by United Nations
The Turkish sector of the United Nations that deal with peace-keeping awarded Rouvas with the International Abdi Ipekçi Prize after his concert with Burak Kut on neutral territory on the Green Line in Cyprus that caused political turmoil and became a leading international news story. Greek politicians Konstantinos Mitsotakis and George Papandreou also received the same honor that year.

World Music Awards
The World Music Awards are an annual international awards ceremony since 1989 that honors recording artists from all over the world based on sales figures provided by the International Federation of the Phonographic Industry (IFPI). The awards show is conducted under the patronage of H.S.H. Prince Albert of Monaco, Monte-Carlo.

The show is broadcast to North and South America, all of Europe, the Middle East, Japan and South East Asia, all of China, some other parts of Asia, Australia, New Zealand, and all of Africa, reaching an estimated worldwide audience of around one billion viewers, in over 160 countries.

The regional awards, as many of the other awards, are not awarded standard annually, but when it is believed that the artist has sold a notable number of records in his or her respective category or genre. Rouvas was only the third Greek artist living and working in Greece to ever receive the award in its history, being awarded after Despina Vandi and Haris Alexiou respectively. He became the first and to date only male working in Greece to receive this award, as well as the most recent recipient.

 Greek Theatre Critics Association Awards

Honorary titles and recognition
Rouvas was one of the youngest artists to release a full-length studio album in Greece.
Rouvas was one of the youngest artists to ever have an album achieve gold certification or to go to number 1 on the Greek Albums Chart.
Rouvas has the largest Greek fanclub, the SRFC (Sakis Rouvas Fanclub) since its start in 1996.
In 1998, after winning the award at the Hellenic Music Awards'', Rouvas was named "Greece's Best Stage Performer".
In 2004, Rouvas was the highest-paid entertainer in the Greek entertainment industry and was named Greece's most successful contemporary male artist.
Since 2008, Rouvas has been recognized as one of Greece's best-selling artists in history with sales of over two million albums.

References

External links
 Official site

Rouvas, Zakis
Sakis Rouvas